Darrius Allen Shepherd (born November 1, 1995) is an American football wide receiver for the St. Louis BattleHawks of the XFL. He played college football at North Dakota State, and was originally signed by the Green Bay Packers as an undrafted free agent in 2020.

Early life
Shepherd was born one of three children to Amy Shepherd. His brother is named Xavier and his sister is named Cheyenne. Shepherd's father Louis, played college football for Missouri and his grandfather played college basketball for Missouri State and professionally for the Los Angeles Lakers.

High school career
Shepherd attended Blue Springs High School in Blue Springs, Missouri. Shepherd committed to North Dakota State over an offer from Valparaiso.

College career
Shepherd finished his college career with the Bison recording 188 receptions for 2,841 yards and 20 touchdowns. Shepherd graduated in May 2018 from North Dakota State with a bachelor's degree in university studies while minoring in psychology.

Professional career

Green Bay Packers
On May 6, 2019, Shepherd was signed by the Green Bay Packers after being invited to rookie camp. He recorded his first NFL catch, a 1-yard reception from Aaron Rodgers, during a Week 6 win over the Detroit Lions on October 14, 2019. He was waived on October 29 and re-signed to the practice squad. He signed a reserve/future contract with the Packers on January 21, 2020.

Shepherd was waived on September 5, 2020, and signed to the practice squad the next day. He was promoted to the active roster on September 26, 2020. He was waived on December 1, 2020.

Kansas City Chiefs
On June 17, 2021, Shepherd signed with the Kansas City Chiefs. He was released on August 31, 2021.

Arizona Cardinals
On November 10, 2021, Shepherd was signed to the Arizona Cardinals practice squad. He was released on November 15, 2021.

Minnesota Vikings
On December 15, 2021, Shepherd was signed to the Minnesota Vikings practice squad. He was released on December 21, 2021.

Pittsburgh Steelers
On December 30, 2021, Shepherd was signed to the Pittsburgh Steelers practice squad. He was released on January 3, 2022.

New Jersey Generals
On February 23, 2022, Shepherd was drafted by the New Jersey Generals.

Denver Broncos
On August 4, 2022, Shepherd signed with the Denver Broncos. He was waived on August 30, 2022 and signed to the practice squad the next day. He was released on October 11.

NFL career statistics

Regular season

References

External links

North Dakota State Bison bio

1995 births
Living people
American football wide receivers
Arizona Cardinals players
Denver Broncos players
Green Bay Packers players
Kansas City Chiefs players
Minnesota Vikings players
New Jersey Generals (2022) players
North Dakota State Bison football players
People from Blue Springs, Missouri
Pittsburgh Steelers players
Players of American football from Missouri
Sportspeople from the Kansas City metropolitan area
St. Louis BattleHawks players